S Apodis , also known as HD 133444 is a variable star located in the southern circumpolar constellation Apus. It has an apparent magnitude ranging from 9.6 to 17, which is below the limit for naked eye visibility.

HD 133444 has been known to be a variable star since 1896.  However, its nature as a carbon star was not observed until 1967 by astronomer Brian Warner. In 1973, HD 133444 was listed as a R Coronae Borealis variable.  These are extremely hydrogen-deficient supergiants thought to have arisen as the result of the merger of two white dwarfs and fewer than 100 have been discovered as of 2013. A decade later, S Apodis was observed to have a change it its pulsation mode.

S Apodis has a stellar classification of R3, indicating that it is a R-type carbon star. However, it has expanded to an average radius 132 times that of the Sun. An infrared excess has been detected around the star, indicating the presence of circumstellar dust. The dust has a temperature of 730 K.

References

Apus (constellation)
R Coronae Borealis variables
133444
Apodis, S
Durchmusterung objects
074179
15092452-7203451